Vladimir Tintor may refer to:

 Vladimir Tintor (actor) (born 1978), Serbian film actor
 Vladimir Tintor (footballer) (born 1979), Serbian professional football player